Rusted Angel is the debut album by Swedish metal band Darkane. This was the only Darkane album with Lawrence Mackrory until his return in mid-2011. The song "July 1999" is about one Nostradamus prediction.

Track listing

Personnel

Darkane
Christofer Malmström – lead guitar 
Peter Wildoer – drum kit
Jörgen Löfberg – bass guitar
Klas Ideberg – rhythm guitar
Lawrence Mackrory – vocals

Production
Wez Wenedikter – executive producer
Daniel Bergstrand – production, engineering, mixing
Peter In de Betou – mastering
Chad Michael Ward – artwork

References

1999 albums
Darkane albums